Dondisia was a genus of flowering plants in the family Rubiaceae but is no longer recognized. It has been sunk into synonymy with Canthium. It was originally described by Augustin Pyramus de Candolle in 1830.

Former species
 Dondisia fetida Hassk. = Vangueria madagascariensis var. madagascariensis
 Dondisia foetida Hassk. = Vangueria madagascariensis var. madagascariensis
 Dondisia horrida (Blume) Korth. = Canthium horridum
 Dondisia leschenaultii DC. = Canthium angustifolium

External links 
 World Checklist of Rubiaceae

Historically recognized Rubiaceae genera
Vanguerieae
Taxa named by Augustin Pyramus de Candolle